Eugène-Louis Hauvette-Besnault (5 February 1820 – 28 June 1888) was a 19th-century French Indologist.

Biography 
Eugène-Louis Hauvette-Besnault was professor of sanskrit at the École pratique des hautes études (EPHE). Agrégé de lettres in 1853, he translated volumes IV and V of the Bhagavata Purana.

He was one of Eugène Burnouf's last students. Among his own students in Sanskrit were James Darmesteter and Abel Bergaigne.

The historian and epigrapher René Cagnat was his stepson.

Publications 
1859: Morceaux choisis en prose et en vers des classiques anglais, with Frédéric-Gustave Eichhoff.
1865: Pantchâdhyâyi, ou les Cinq chapitres sur les amours de Crichna avec les Gopîs, extrait du Bhâgavata Purâna, livre X, chapitres XXIX-XXXIII
1867: Le Mahâbhârata, poème épique de Krishna-Dwaipayana, traduit complètement pour la première fois du sanscrit en français, by M. Hippolyte Fauche. Compte rendu signé Hauvette-Besnault
1881: Le Bhâgavata purâna ou Histoire poétique de Kreichna, by Eugène Burnouf, Eugène Louis Hauvette-Besnault, Alfred Roussel and Jean Filliozat
1886: Épisode des grains de riz écrasés
1898: Le Bhâgavata Purâna ou Histoire poétique de Kreichna by Eugène Burnouf, Eugène-Louis Hauvette-Besnault and Alfred Roussel

External links 
 Eugène-Louis Hauvette-Besnault on data.bnf.fr
 Eugène-Louis Hauvette-Besnault on wikisource

French Indologists
Academic staff of the École pratique des hautes études
People from Loiret
1820 births
1888 deaths
19th-century French translators